Ktav Stam is the specific Jewish traditional writing with which holy scrolls, tefillin and mezuzot are written. Stam is a Hebrew acronym denoting these writings, as indicated by the gershayim punctuation mark. The writing is done by means of a feather and ink (known as ) onto special parchment called klaf. There exist two primary traditions in respect to the formation of the letters, Ktav HaAshkenazi and Ktav HaSefardi, however the differences between them are slight.

Parchment

Klaf is the material on which a sofer writes certain Jewish liturgical and ritual documents, the kosher form of parchment or vellum. The writing material can be made of the specially prepared skin of a kosher animal – goat, cattle, or deer. The hide can consist of:
 Gevil, the full, un-split hide;
 Klaf, the outer, hairy layer; or
 Duchsustus

Only gevil and klaf can be used for holy writings. Duchsustus is not permitted. However, duchsustus is used for writing a mezuzah.

Writing device (kulmus)
The  is the feather or reed used for the writing. The original source of the word stems from the Greek  The feathers need to be obtained from a large bird and today the feathers of turkeys are most often used for this purpose. There is some debate however, as to whether feathers must be obtained from a kosher bird species or not.

Ink (deyo)
The special ink prepared for the writing is called . Maimonides wrote that the d'yo is prepared in the following way:

One collects the soot of oils, of tar, of wax, or the like, and kneads it together with sap from a tree and a drop of honey. It is moistened extensively, crushed until it is formed into flat cakes, dried, and then stored. When one desires to write with it, one soaks it in gallnut juice or the like and writes with it. Thus, if one attempts to rub it out, he would be able to. This is the ink with which it is most preferable to write scrolls, tefillin, and mezuzot. If however one wrote any of the three with gallnut juice or vitriol, which remains without being rubbed out, it is acceptable.

Sirtut

 are straight lines that the sofer must, by Torah law, etch into the klaf. The obligation primarily pertains to Sifrei Torah, Mezuza, and Meggila, however there are those who are similarly accustomed to placing sirtut on the Arba Parshiyot for tefillin. This helps the sofer write in neat straight lines.

Spiritual attitude (ktiva lishma)
Every aspect of the process must be done lishma, which is to say for its own sake with pure motives. The sofer must also be particularly concentrated upon the writing of any of the Divine Names. At many junctures in the process he is obligated to verbalize the fact that he is performing his action lishma.

Form of the letters

The K'tav Ashuri is the only permissible Hebrew script, however over the centuries in Exile some minor variations have developed. The two primary traditions are Ktav HaAshkenazi and Ktav HaSefardi.

Ktav Ashkenazi is split into two categories:
 Ktav Bet Yosef – which is the standard Ashkenaz tradition.
 Ktav HaAri – which is the Hasidic tradition.

Ktav Sefardi (also known as Vellish) – is the standard utilized by Mizrahi Jews, and Yemenite Jews.

Serifs (tagin)

On the letters  there are three , on the letters  there is one , and on the letters  there are none.

Errors
Some errors are inevitable in the course of production. If the error involves a word other than a Divine Name, the mistaken letter may be removed from the scroll by scraping the letter off the scroll with a sharp object. If the Divine Name is written in error, the entire page, if written in a Torah, must be cut from the scroll and a new page added, and the page written anew from the beginning. The new page is sewn into the scroll to maintain continuity of the document. The old page is treated with appropriate respect, and is either buried, or stored away with respect rather than otherwise destroyed or discarded. In tefillin and mezuzot all the letters, the words and the parashot are required to be written in the order they appear in the Torah. Within any of the parashot if an error or an invalidated letter is discovered, or a missing letter was discovered after the completion of the writing, the rest of the document must be erased from the end all the way back to the error, to fix it, and write it anew.

See also
 Sifrei Torah production
 Yad

References

External links
 Keset HaSofer in Hebrew
 Keset HaSofer in English
 Information on how to be sofer, diaries and sources
 Vaad Mishmereth STaM - Institute for the Preservation of STaM

Jewish law and rituals
Hebrew calligraphy
Hebrew words and phrases in Jewish law